The 1984 Hamilton Tiger-Cats season was the 27th season for the team in the Canadian Football League and their 35th overall. The Tiger-Cats finished in 2nd place in the East Division with a 6–9–1 record. They appeared in the 72nd Grey Cup game, but lost to the Winnipeg Blue Bombers.

Roster

Preseason

Regular season

Season Standings

Season schedule

Postseason

Schedule

Grey Cup

Awards and honours
Terry Evanshen was elected into the Canadian Football Hall of Fame as a Player, March 16, 1984.
Tony Gabriel was elected into the Canadian Football Hall of Fame as a Player, August 18, 1984.
Jacob Gaudaur was elected into the Canadian Football Hall of Fame as a Player as a Builder, March 16, 1984.

1984 CFL All-Stars
Bernie Ruoff, Punter

References

Hamilton Tiger-cats Season, 1984
Hamilton Tiger-Cats seasons
James S. Dixon Trophy championship seasons
1984 Canadian Football League season by team